Kentucky Route 255 (KY 255) is a  south-north state highway located in south central Kentucky. It provides access to Interstate 65 and Mammoth Cave National park to residents of southern Barren County.

Route description

Rocky Hill to Park City
KY 255 begins at a junction with KY 252 in Barren County, near the Rocky Hill community. The route is narrow and considerably curvy until coming to a junction with KY 1297 about  later. After this junction, the route straightens somewhat, proceeding north for another  before coming to an intersection with the cojoined US 68/KY 80 in the Bon Ayr community.

KY 255 widens somewhat past this point, continuing on for another mile before bridging the Louie B. Nunn Cumberland Parkway via way of an overpass. The route then proceeds north for  before coming to an intersection with KY 1339.

KY 255 then continues north for  before being carried onto a bridge over a CSX railroad track, the Louisville and Nashville Railroad before intersecting U.S. Route 31W. KY 255 previously passed the ruins of Bells Tavern, and then intersected US 31W (Second Street) after a railroad crossing until 2012, when it was re-routed to go over the tracks via a new bridge on the west side of town. KY 255's concurrent run with US 31W lasts , where KY 255 turns left onto Mammoth Cave Parkway.

Mammoth Cave National Park and northwestern Barren County

After its brief concurrency with US 31W, KY 255 branches north, going  before intersecting with Interstate 65 at its Exit 48 interchange. It proceeds north for another 0.9 miles, passing Diamond Caverns before entering the far eastern portion of Edmonson County and reaching its first intersection with KY 70 in the southern part of the park. This was KY 255's original northern terminus from the 1930s until sometime in the mid 1970s. At that point KY 255 joins KY 70 by making a right turn eastward to re-enter Barren County. This concurrency lasts for  before reaching an intersection in Highland Springs, where KY 255 turns left, while KY 70 turns right to head for Cave City. KY 255's current northern terminus is located near the Sand Cave Trail at another entry into the Mammoth Cave National Park. That point marks the end of state maintenance. The road itself, however continues into the park solely as Cave City Road, and ends at another intersection with the Mammoth Cave Parkway just south of the park's visitor center. This road was part of the original KY 70 alignment within the park until it was rerouted to its current in-park alignment in the 1970s.

History 
The state route was established during the 1930s. it originally ran from Park City, following the Barren-Edmonson County line, and then eastward to end where the current eastern split of KY 255 and KY 70 is located. In the 1950s, KY 255 designation was extended onto formerly locally maintained back roads from Park City southward to Bon Ayr (formerly Bonayer), and further south to KY 252 at Game, Kentucky (now Rocky Hill) just north of the then-impounded Barren River, which formed Barren River Lake sometime later. Ky 255 was also extended onto the old KY 70 alignment from the current KY255/70 split in Barren County to the southeast boundary of the Mammoth Cave park.

Points of interest
The ruins of Bells Tavern are located alongside the original KY 255 alignment near the railroad tracks. Built in 1830, it was a favorite stop of wealthy patrons before it burned in 1860. A roadside marker marks the location of the tavern and details some of its history.

Diamond Caverns, the second oldest cave tour operation in the United States, is located just off of KY 255, just north of its intersection with I-65. A roadside marker gives a history of the site.

Major intersections

References

External links
Bells Tavern Gallery

0255
Mammoth Cave National Park
0255
0255